Acer caesium, the Himalayan maple, is an Asian species of maple found in India, Pakistan, Nepal, and China (Gansu, Henan, Hubei, Ningxia, Shaanxi, Sichuan, Tibet, Yunnan).

The flowers are a bluish white and born on young shoots in the spring. The subspecies epithet is a patronym honoring Italian missionary Giraldi.

References

External links
 
 line drawing for Flora of Pakistan
 line drawing for Flora of China

caesium
Plants described in 1874
Flora of China
Flora of the Indian subcontinent